Center Township is a township in Pottawattamie County, Iowa, USA.

History
Center Township was organized in 1856.

References

Townships in Pottawattamie County, Iowa
Townships in Iowa